The Judiciary of Cyprus is the system of courts which interprets and applies the law in Cyprus. It is largely based on the English model. Judicial independence is safeguarded by the Constitution.

Law
The applicable laws in Cyprus are the Constitution, the laws of Article 188 in the Constitution, the Common Law and Equity and laws enabled by the Cyprus House of Representatives.

District Courts
The District Courts are courts of first instance for civil matters (except those which are dealt with by special courts such as the Family Court, the Rent Control Court, or the Industrial Disputes Court) and criminal cases involving prison sentences of five years of less. There are six such courts: Nicosia, Famagusta, Kyrenia (located in Nicosia), Larnaca, Limassol, and Paphos.

Assize Courts
The Assize Courts are courts first instance for criminal cases which involve prison sentences of more than five years.

The Assize Courts consist of three judges with no jury and may be composed of either:
 a district president and two district judges 
 a district president, a senior district judge and a district judge 
 a district president and two senior district judges.

There are four such courts: Nicosia, Larnaca, Limassol, and Paphos.

The Supreme Court
The Supreme Court was established in 1964 from a merger of the Supreme Constitutional Court and the High Court. Although it can act as a court of first instance it is primarily an appeal court for both civil and criminal cases. As an appellate court the Supreme Court can review and re-examine all the evidence, request or admit other evidence and order cases to be reheard. It is composed of 13 judges, one of whom acts as the court president.

The Supreme Court also acts as a constitutional, admiralty and administrative court. It can also rule on electoral issues. It is based in Nicosia.

Other courts
There are three Family Courts: one for Nicosia and Kyrenia, one for Limassol and Paphos and one for Larnaca and Famagusta which decide in divorce, child custody and real estate matters. There is also a family court for religious groups in Nicosia.

There are two Rent Control Courts which try cases of recovery of property, property rentals and associated matters.

There are three Industrial Disputes Tribunals, based in Nicosia, Larnaca and Limassol, which have jurisdiction over employment matters.

The Military Court has jurisdiction over military matters.

Judges
Judges are members of the Judicial Service of the Republic. All judges, except those of the Supreme Court, are appointed by the Supreme Council of Judicature, a body composed of the judges of the Supreme Court, which is responsible for their appointment, promotion, transfer and discipline. Supreme Court Judges are appointed by the President of the Republic on the recommendation of the Supreme Court.

There are 85 judges serving in all courts of first instance and 13 judges serving in the Supreme Court. They cannot be removed from office except under very exceptional circumstances. Supreme Court Judges retire at the age of 68, whereas those of all other courts retire at the age of 63.

References

See also
 Chief Justice of Cyprus - Colonial era

 
Government of Cyprus
Law of Cyprus